The following is a list of the MuchMusic Video Awards winners for Best Dance Video.

References

MuchMusic Video Awards
M